Sheung Shui (: , literally "Above-water") is the penultimate northbound station on the  in Hong Kong. This station serves as the terminus of northbound trains after the Lo Wu and Lok Ma Chau boundary crossings have closed for the day.  It is also the last northbound station on the East Rail line that passengers without a Closed Area Permit, Mainland Travel Permit, or valid passport and mainland Chinese visa may freely travel to.

This station is located in the North District, New Territories, Hong Kong, serving the Sheung Shui area and its vicinity.

History
On 1 October 1910, the Kowloon-Canton Railway British Section opened to the public, but Sheung Shui station was not added until 16 May 1930. Full electrification of KCR completed on 15 July 1983. Lok Ma Chau Spur Line was added on 15 August 2007.

In anticipation of an increase in patronage expected to accompany the commissioning of the Lok Ma Chau Spur Line, a new southern concourse was opened at Sheung Shui station in January 2006.

Layout 
Markers were provided on the northbound platform following the opening of Lok Ma Chau station. Two queues, blue and green, are set up at the boarding areas. Platform 1 is the termination platform of northbound trains after Lo Wu and Lok Ma Chau boundary crossings have closed for the day, and so platform 2 (southbound platform) is the only platform for boarding.

Exits 

Concourse (1/F)
 Exit A
 A1: Choi Yuen Estate (footbridge)
 A2: Choi Yuen Road, Platform 1 to Lo Wu (escalators)
 Exit B
 B1: San Wan Road, Shek Wu Hui (escalators)
 B2: Landmark North (footbridge)
 B3: Sheung Shui Centre (footbridge)
 Exit E
 E: Yuk Po Court, Tai Ping Estate, North District Hospital (footbridge)
 Exit F
 F: Sheung Shui Centre, Sheung Shui Town Centre, North District Town Hall (footbridge)
Ground (G/F)
 Exit C (connected to platform 1)
 C: Choi Yuen Road
 Exit D (connected to platform 2)
 D1: San Wan Road, Shek Wu Hui, minibus terminus
 D2: San Wan Road, residents' services bus stop

Gallery

References

External links 

 MTR Corporation－Sheung Shui Station street map
 MTR Corporation－Sheung Shui Station layout

Sheung Shui
MTR stations in the New Territories
East Rail line
Former Kowloon–Canton Railway stations
Railway stations in Hong Kong opened in 1930